Jim Gillespie is a Scottish film director. His directing work includes I Know What You Did Last Summer (1997), D-Tox (2002), and Venom (2005).

Filmography

Films

References

External links

Scottish film directors
Horror film directors
Living people
Film people from Glasgow
Year of birth missing (living people)